Hans-Dieter Frank (8 July 1919 – 28 September 1943) was a German Luftwaffe military aviator during World War II, a night fighter ace credited with 55 aerial victories claimed in approximately 150 combat missions making him the seventeenth most successful night fighter pilot in the history of aerial warfare. All of his victories were claimed over the Western Front in Defense of the Reich missions against the Royal Air Force's (RAF) Bomber Command.

Born in Kiel, Frank grew up in the Weimar Republic and Nazi Germany. Following graduation from school, he joined the military service in 1937 and was trained as a pilot. Frank then served with Zerstörergeschwader 1 (ZG 1—1st Destroyer Wing), flying a Messerschmitt Bf 110 heavy fighter during the Invasion of Poland and Battle of France. In mid-1941, he transferred to Nachtjagdgeschwader 1 (NJG 1—1st Night Fighter Wing) where he became a night fighter pilot and claimed his first aerial victory on the night of 10/11 April 1941. Frank was appointed squadron leader of 2. Staffel (2nd squadron) of NJG 1 in August 1942. Following his 33rd aerial victory, he was awarded the Knight's Cross of the Iron Cross on 20 June 1943. On 1 July 1943, he was appointed group commander of I. Gruppe of NJG 1. Frank and his crew were killed in action in a mid-air collision with another German night fighter on the night of 27/28 September 1943. He was posthumously bestowed with the Knight's Cross of the Iron Cross with Oak Leaves and promoted to Major (major).

Early life and career
Frank was born on 8 July 1919 in Kiel, which was then part of the Province of Schleswig-Holstein during the Weimar Republic. He was the son of a sales agent. After graduation from school and receipt of his Abitur (university entry qualification), Frank joined the Luftwaffe in 1937 as a Fahnenjunker (cadet). Following flight training, he was posted to Zerstörergeschwader 1 (ZG 1—1st Destroyer Wing).

World War II
World War II in Europe began on Friday 1 September 1939 when German forces invaded Poland. Now a Leutnant (second lieutenant) with I. Gruppe (1st group) of ZG 1, Frank flew his first combat missions over Poland and during the Battle of France. On 22 June 1940, Nachtjagdgeschwader 1 (NJG 1—1st Night Fighter Wing) was created from I. Gruppe of ZG 1 and placed under the command of Hauptmann Wolfgang Falck. In consequence, Frank became a member of the night-fighter force.

Night fighter career

Following the 1939 aerial Battle of the Heligoland Bight, Royal Air Force (RAF) attacks shifted to the cover of darkness, initiating the Defence of the Reich campaign. By mid-1940, Generalmajor (Brigadier General) Josef Kammhuber had established a night air defense system dubbed the Kammhuber Line. It consisted of a series of control sectors equipped with radars and searchlights and an associated night fighter. Each sector named a Himmelbett (canopy bed) would direct the night fighter into visual range with target bombers. In 1941, the Luftwaffe started equipping night fighters with airborne radar such as the Lichtenstein radar. This airborne radar did not come into general use until early 1942. On 25 August 1941, Frank became an ace after downing his 5th victim, Armstrong Whitworth Whitley, Z6505, MH-F, No. 51 Squadron RAF. Sergeant J. C. W. King and his crew were captured. He was appointed Staffelkapitän (squaron leader) of 2. Staffel of NJG 1 on 8 August 1942. On 27 November 1942, Frank was awarded the German Cross in Gold.

Frank was decorated with the Knight's Cross of the Iron Cross on 20 June 1943, the nomination had been submitted for 33 aerial victories claimed. The presentation was made by Generalmajor Kammhuber. On the night of 21/22 June, RAF Bomber Command sent 705 aircraft on a mission to bomb Krefeld, losing 44 aircraft in the attack. That night, Frank claimed six victories in the early hours, making him an "ace-in-a-day". One of the bombers he shot down was Handley Page Halifax HR848, which was one of 19 No. 35 Squadron RAF aircraft detailed to attack Krefeld on the night of the 21/22 June. Flight Sergeant R. J. Quigley and two of his crew were captured and the remaining four perished. Another was HR735 operated by No. 158 Squadron RAF. Pilot Officer C. H. Robinson DFC RNZAF and his six crew were killed. A third, BB375, flown by German-Canadian Sergeant C. C. Reichert RCAF, No. 408 Squadron RAF, crashed with all but one crewman killed. Further victories included an Avro Lancaster bomber from No. 100 Squadron RAF near Dinther, and two Halifax bombers from 408 (Goose) Squadron near Zeist and Lopik.

On 24/25 June Sergeant Robert Whitfield's Halifax JD258, VR-K borrowed from No. 419 Bomber Squadron RCAF, but operated by a No. 428 Squadron RAF crew, became Frank's 41st aerial victory. All of the crew died. The aircraft was on a mission to bomb Elberfeld, a municipal of Wuppertal. Frank's last victory in June 1943 occurred on day twenty-nine when he shot down his 44th victim; Lancaster bomber ED362, HW-E, flown by Pilot Officer J. P. Pascoe RCAF, No. 100 Squadron RAF. Pascoe and all but one of his crew were killed (Sergeant R. G Storr was taken prisoner). That night, RAF Bomber Command was targeting Cologne.

Group commander

On 1 July 1943, Frank was appointed Gruppenkommandeur (group commander) of I. Gruppe of NJG 1, succeeding Major Werner Streib. Operating from Venlo Airfield, Frank claimed his first aerial victory as Gruppenkommandeur on the night of 9/10 July when he attacked Lancaster bomber W4763 from No. 61 Squadron RAF which crashed near Overdinkel in the Netherlands. Four nights later, he shot down a Halifax bomber from No. 401 Squadron RCAF and another Halifax bomber from No. XXXV (Madras Presidency) Squadron. Frank claimed his first aerial victories flying the Heinkel He 219 night fighter of the night of 25/26 July when claimed two aerial victories, a Lancaster bomber from No. 50 Squadron RAF and a Wellington bomber from 429 (Bomber) Squadron RCAF. When on the night 30/31 August 660 bombers targeted both Mönchengladbach and Rheydt, Frank was credited with the destruction of three bombers. His aerial victories included a Short Stirling bomber over Mönchengladbach, the Vickers Wellington bomber JA118 from the Royal Canadian Air Force No. 432 Squadron RCAF, and a Lancaster bomber which crashed near Brüggen.

Frank and his radio operator Oberfeldwebel Erich Gotter were killed following a mid-air collision with another German night fighter northwest of Celle in the night of 28/29 September 1943. Their He 219 A-0 (Werknummer 190055—factory number) "G9+CB" had collided with a Bf 110 G-4 of the Geschwaderstab (headquarters unit) of NJG 1 during the landing approach. Frank had escaped the aircraft using the ejection seat but forgot to release his radio-cable. He landed safely but was strangled by the radio-cable. The three man crew of the Bf 110 G-4, pilot Hauptmann Günther Friedrich, radio operator Oberleutnant Werner Gerber and flight engineer Obergefreiter Kurt Weißke, were also killed in the accident. This collision was likely caused by an attack made on his fighter by RAF night fighter ace Bob Braham. On 2 March 1944, Frank was posthumously awarded the Knight's Cross of the Iron Cross with Oak Leaves, the 417th officer or soldier of the Wehrmacht so honored. Posthumously, he was also promoted to Major (major). He was succeeded by Hauptmann Manfred Meurer as commander of I. Gruppe of NJG 1.

Summary of career

Aerial victory claims
Frank was credited with 55 nocturnal aerial victories claimed in 328 combat missions. Foreman, Parry and Mathews, authors of Luftwaffe Night Fighter Claims 1939 – 1945, researched the German Federal Archives and found records for 54 nocturnal victory claims Mathews and Foreman also published Luftwaffe Aces — Biographies and Victory Claims, listing Frank with 51 claims.

Awards
 Honour Goblet of the Luftwaffe on 19 October 1942 as Oberleutnant and pilot
 German Cross in Gold on 27 November 1942 as Oberleutnant in the 2./Nachtjagdgeschwader 1
 Knight's Cross of the Iron Cross with Oak Leaves
 Knight's Cross on 20 June 1943 as Hauptmann and Staffelkapitän of the 2./Nachtjagdgeschwader 1
 417th Oak Leaves on 2 March 1944 as Hauptmann and Gruppenkommandeur of the I./Nachtjagdgeschwader 1

Notes

References

Citations

Bibliography

 
 
 
 
 
 
 
 
 
 
 
 
 
 
 
 
 
 
 
 
 
 
 
 
 
 
 
 
 
 
 
 
 
 
 
 
 
 
 
 
 
 
 
 
 
 
 
 
 
 
 
 
 
 
 
 
 
 
 

1919 births
1943 deaths
Aviators killed in aviation accidents or incidents in Germany
Military personnel from Kiel
German World War II flying aces
Recipients of the Gold German Cross
Recipients of the Knight's Cross of the Iron Cross with Oak Leaves
Luftwaffe personnel killed in World War II
People from the Province of Schleswig-Holstein
Victims of aviation accidents or incidents in 1943